Fort Pillow State Historic Park is a state park in western Tennessee that preserves the American Civil War site of the Battle of Fort Pillow.  The 1,642 acre (6.6 km²) Fort Pillow, located in Lauderdale County on the Chickasaw Bluffs overlooking the Mississippi River, is rich in both historic and archaeological significance. In 1861, the Confederate army built extensive fortifications  and named the site for General Gideon Johnson Pillow of Maury County. It was attacked and held by the Union Army for most of the American Civil War period except immediately after the Battle of Fort Pillow, when it was retaken by the Confederate Army. The battle ended with a massacre of African-American Union troops and their white officers attempting to surrender, by soldiers under the command of Confederate Major General Nathan Bedford Forrest. Interpretive sites are part of the park.

Union fort, and Battle of Fort Pillow

 Because of its strategic location controlling traffic on the Mississippi River, the fort was attacked and captured by the Union Army, which controlled it during most of the war. On June 4, 1862, Confederate troops evacuated Fort Pillow, enabling Union troops to take Memphis, Tennessee. An exception to Union control of this site took place for less than one day immediately after the Confederate victory in the Battle of Fort Pillow in 1864.

The Confederate States Army defeated the Union troops at the Battle of Fort Pillow (April 1864), resulting in the massacre of 229 of the 262 black Union soldiers engaged in the battle. The white Union soldiers numbered 285. An examination of regimental records showed that "less than 36 percent of the men from white units died in battle or of wounds, while the death toll for black units was 66 percent."

A Confederate wrote in a letter home that "Forrest ordered them [negroes] shot down like dogs, and the carnage continued." In addition to regimental records, contemporary accounts by troops on both sides, as well as journalists, describe it as appalling slaughter. Within about three weeks, as political controversy grew, Confederates began to dispute accounts of a massacre. Subsequent reports after the battle from Union officers to the Department of War countered much that was reported in the popular press and some of the testimony given before Congress.  This slaughter by the Confederate troops under Gen. Nathan Bedford Forrest has been classified by historians as a massacre.

"Remember Fort Pillow!" became a battle cry among black Union soldiers for the remainder of the Civil War. While the Union casualty count for the battle does not indicate that the Confederate forces took many prisoners, Confederate records show about 200 prisoners were shipped south.

In 1866, the Union Army created a cemetery for both Confederate and Union soldiers south of the battle site. In 1867, they moved about 250 bodies of Confederate and Union soldiers from that cemetery to the Memphis National Cemetery.

Historic site and museum
In 1973, the site was added to the National Register of Historic Places. It was designated as a National Historic Landmark in 1974. Remains of the fort's earthworks were well-preserved as of 2011.

The park has an interpretive center and museum (open 8 a.m. – 4 p.m. daily, except for certain holidays). Tours of the museum and restored fortifications are available upon request.  The park also offers many recreational activities, including camping, picnicking and fishing.

See also
 Fort Pillow naval battle
 Golddust, Tennessee
 List of National Historic Landmarks in Tennessee
 National Register of Historic Places listings in Lauderdale County, Tennessee

References

External links
 Fort Pillow State Historic Park

State parks of Tennessee
Archaeological sites on the National Register of Historic Places in Tennessee
Archaeological sites in Tennessee
Protected areas on the Mississippi River
Pillow
National Historic Landmarks in Tennessee
Battlefields of the Western Theater of the American Civil War
Museums in Lauderdale County, Tennessee
American Civil War museums in Tennessee
Protected areas of Lauderdale County, Tennessee
Pillow
1861 establishments in Tennessee
National Register of Historic Places in Lauderdale County, Tennessee
American Civil War on the National Register of Historic Places
American Civil War forts
African-American history of Tennessee
Protected areas established in 1971